The monastery of the Archangel Gabriel at Naqlun (Arab. دير الملاك غبريال بجبل, Dajr el-Malak Ghubrail, Dayr al-Malāk Ghubriyāl, also: Dajr el-Naqlun, Dayr al-Naqlūn or Dayr Abū al-Khashabah, Dajr Abu al-Chaszaba) – a Coptic monastery of the Archangel Gabriel located in northern Egypt, in the Faiyum Oasis, 16 km south-east of the city of Faiyum in the Libyan Desert. Since 1986, it is investigated by a team of researchers from the Polish Centre of Mediterranean Archaeology University of Warsaw, headed by Prof. Włodzimierz Godlewski. In 1997, the Church of St. Gabriel was restored.

Architecture and archaeological discoveries 
The walls of the monastery have been preserved both in the outer and inner courtyards. The Church of St. Gabriel has three sanctuaries, dedicated to the Archangel Gabriel, the Holy Virgin, and St. George. The site also encompasses 90 rock-cut hermitages and the surrounding architecture from different periods. The monastery has been functioning since the 5th century to the present day, but its organization changed with time.

Polish archaeologists also discovered two Christian necropolises. Cemetery C, with more than 180 graves, is located to the west of the monastic complex and was used in the 6th–7th century. Cemetery A contains about 500 burials dated from the 11th to the 13th century. Numerous fragments of textiles have been preserved in the graves.

The excavations also yielded about 1,000 texts in Greek, Coptic, and Arabic, as well as one text in Latin, which has been identified as a fragment of Livy's History of Rome.

The wooden ceiling of the Church of the Archangel Gabriel was decorated with polychromies. Depictions of the Archangel Gabriel, St. Mercurius, St. George, the Holy Virgin, Christ, Psote (Bisada), and St. Simeon Stylites dated to the 11th century were uncovered on its walls. Wall paintings of the Holy Virgin and the Apostles adorned the central apse.

External links 

 Polish archaeological expedition to Naqlun (1986–2016)

Further reading 

 Godlewski, W., Danys, K. and Maślak, S. (2016). Deir el-Naqlun 2014–2015. Preliminary report. Polish Archaeology in the Mediterranean, 25.
 Łajtar, A., Obłuski, A. and Zych, I. (eds) (2016), Aegyptus et Nubia Christiana. The Włodzimierz Godlewski jubilee volume on the occasion of his 70th birthday. Warsaw: PCMA UW.
 Maślak, S. (2012). Buildings on Site B at Naqlun (Nekloni). Polish Archaeology in the Mediterranean, 21, 653–676.
 Godlewski, W. (2011). In the shade of the Nekloni monastery (Deir Malak Gubrail, Fayum). Polish Archaeology in the Mediterranean, 20,  (ang.).
 Zych, I. (2008). Cemetery C in Naqlun: Preliminary report on the excavation in 2006. Polish Archaeology in the Mediterranean, 18, 230–246.
 Meinardus, O. F. A. (2002).Two Thousand Years of Coptic Christianity. American Univ in Cairo Press. .

Footnotes 

Monasteries
Archaeological sites in Egypt